Mechanicsburg is an unincorporated community in Clay County, Indiana, in the United States.

History
Mechanicsburg was laid out in 1871. The founder hoped to attract skilled workers such as mechanics.

References

Unincorporated communities in Clay County, Indiana
Unincorporated communities in Indiana